Samuel Hadida (17 December 1953 – 26 November 2018) was a Moroccan-born French film producer.

Life and career
Hadida was born in Casablanca, Morocco. In 1978, he co-founded the company Metropolitan Filmexport with his brother Victor.  The company later became a successful independent distributor of films in the French-speaking world. Metropolitan Filmexport is the current French distributor for films by Lionsgate and, formerly, New Line Cinema (Warner Bros. now releases New Line films).

In 1990, Hadida formed a new company, Davis Films. Since 1993, the company has produced more than thirty Hollywood films, with True Romance being the first. 

Though Hadida contributed to the film industry over many decades, his work in spearheading the Resident Evil film franchise is what he is best known for. When Hadida learned the project was struggling, he reached out Constantin Film and offered a 50/50 venture deal. This project, as well as his work with the film adaptation of Silent Hill, has contributed to his recognition within the realm of video game adaptations.

Hadida died at the UCLA Santa Monica Hospital after a short illness.

Controversy
In 2011, Davis Films signed an agreement to create a film adaptation of the book series House of Night. Hadida and his company did not follow through on producing the film, yet retained the rights until 2020. This upset the series' fanbase, causing tension between Hadida and the series' authors, P. C. Cast and Kristin Cast.

Filmography

1993: Only the Strong (producer)
1993: True Romance (producer)
1993: Killing Zoe (producer)
1993: Necronomicon (producer)
1995: The Expert (executive producer)
1995: Crying Freeman (producer)
1996: Freeway (producer)
1996: The Adventures of Pinocchio (producer)
1997: Rhinoceros Hunting in Budapest (producer)
1997: Nirvana (producer)
1998: Legionnaire (executive producer)
1999: The Big Brass Ring (executive producer)
1999: Inferno (producer)
1999: Freeway II: Confessions of a Trickbaby (executive producer)
2000: Dancing at the Blue Iguana (executive producer)
2001: Brotherhood of the Wolf (producer)
2001: Laguna (producer)
2002: Resident Evil (producer)
2002: Spider (producer)
2002: Sweat (producer)
2002: Break of Dawn (producer)
2002: The Rules of Attraction (executive producer)
2003: Gift from Above (producer)
2004: Turn Left at the End of the World (producer)
2004: Resident Evil: Apocalypse (executive producer)
2004: Five Children and It (producer)
2004: Battle of the Brave (producer)
2004: The Bridge of San Luis Rey (producer)
2005: Good Night, and Good Luck (executive producer)
2005: The Aura (producer)
2005: Domino (producer)
2005: Lassie (producer)
2006: Silent Hill (producer)
2006: Moscow Zero (producer)
2006: The Black Dahlia (executive producer)
2006: Perfume: The Story of a Murderer (executive producer)
2007: 88 Minutes (producer)
2007: Resident Evil: Extinction (producer)
 2007: Mr. Magorium’s Wonder Emporium (executive producer)
2008: The Secret of Moonacre (producer)
2009: The Imaginarium of Doctor Parnassus (producer)
2009: Solomon Kane (producer)
2010: Resident Evil: Afterlife (producer)
2011: Blitz (executive producer)
2011: Conan the Barbarian (executive producer)
2011: Salmon Fishing in the Yemen (executive producer)
2012: 10 jours en or (producer)
2012: Resident Evil: Retribution (producer)
2012: Silent Hill: Revelation (producer)
2013: The Railway Man (executive producer)
2014: The Expendables 3 (producer)
2014: Sin City: A Dame to Kill For (executive producer)
2015: The Scent of Mandarin (executive producer)
2015: Un + une (producer)
2016: Criminal (executive producer)
2016: Fanny's Journey (producer)
2016: Mechanic: Resurrection (executive producer)
2016: Resident Evil: The Final Chapter (producer)
2017: Everyone's Life (producer)
2017: Loue-moi! (producer)
2017: The Hitman's Bodyguard (executive producer)
2017: Papillon (executive producer)
2017: Chacun sa vie et son intime conviction
2018: Love Addict (producer)
2018: Belleville Cop (producer)
2018: Hunter Killer (executive producer)
2018: La voix humaine (producer)
2019: Sisters in Arms (producer)
2019: The Best Years of a Life (producer)
2019: Lucky Day (film) (producer)
2019: Rambo: Last Blood (executive producer)

References

External links 

1953 births
2018 deaths
People from Casablanca
French film producers
French people of Moroccan descent